The Ministry of Environment is a ministry of the Government of South Sudan. The incumbent minister  is  Mrs. Josephine NAPWON, while Mr.Joseph Africano Bartel serves as the Under Secretary. The Ministry of Environment and Forestry is legally ordered with the Protection and  preservation of lands and all the environment. Also to ensure sustainable utilization of the environmental resource base geared towards meeting the needs of both the contemporary and the future generations.

Location 

The headquarter of the ministry is located at  Ministry of Environment and Forestry Bilpam Road,Juba,South Sudan

Organisational structure 

Administratively, the ministry is divided into  directorates:

 Directorate of Environment 
 Directorate of Forestry

List of Ministers of Environment

References

Environment
South Sudan
Environment of South Sudan
South Sudan, Environment
2011 establishments in South Sudan